Muslim Model High School is a public school situated in Urdu Bazaar, Lahore, Punjab, Pakistan. It is a high school that offers primary education, middle education and matriculation. It is affiliated with Board of Intermediate and Secondary Education, Lahore.
The famous Urdu poet Amjad Islam Amjad also studied at this school.

References 

Schools in Lahore